Louis Unser (1896–1979) was an American auto racer and was the patriarch of the Unser family of racers. He won the Pikes Peak Hillclimb nine times between 1934 and 1953. He is buried at the Fairview Cemetery in Colorado Springs, Colorado.

Complete AAA Championship Car results
(key) (Races in bold indicate pole position)

See also
 Unser (disambiguation) for other family members who were race car drivers

References

1896 births
1979 deaths
Colorado Springs, Colorado

Carrera Panamericana drivers
American racing drivers